Jonathan Morgan, (born 12 November 1974) is a Welsh Conservative politician, who served as a Conservative Assembly Member (AM) for South Wales Central from 1999 to 2007 and AM for Cardiff North from 2007 to 2011. In the National Assembly elections in 2011 he was beaten by Labour's candidate Julie Morgan, wife of former First Minister Rhodri Morgan.

Background
Born in Tongwynlais, Rural North Cardiff, Morgan is the grandson of Winston Griffiths, who stood down after many years as a councillor in Cardiff, while his mother and uncle were elected in 2004 to serve on the same local authority.

Educated at the Bishop of Llandaff Church in Wales High School, Cardiff. Morgan gained a Bachelor's degree in Law and Politics, and a MSc in European Policy from the University of Wales, Cardiff.

Before election to the Welsh Assembly, Morgan was European Officer for Coleg Glan Hafren. Morgan is a Fellow of the Royal Society of Arts. He has also been a Governor at two Cardiff Schools, and a Pupil Barrister, at 9 Park Place from September 2004.

Political career
Elected to the National Assembly for Wales in 1999 for South Wales Central region, Morgan served as education spokesman during the first assembly term, and was appointed as Health Spokesman on his re-election in 2003. Morgan lists Europe, education, health and local government among his political interests.

In 1997 Morgan stood for the Parliament of the United Kingdom in Merthyr Tydfil, while he stood for the assembly elections in May 2003 in Cardiff North, where he reduced Labour's majority to 540. He stood as the Conservative candidate in Cardiff North at the 2005 United Kingdom general election, and again for Cardiff North at the 2007 Welsh Assembly election, where he defeated Labour.

In 2006 Jonathan was named Assembly Member of the Year in the ITV Wales/Wales Yearbook political awards. Judges said praised his work as health spokesman as "substantive, well thought-out and overwhelmingly constructive".

In the Third Assembly he was appointed Shadow Minister for Health and Social Services in the National Assembly for Wales, and is also Chair of the Health, Wellbeing and Local Government Committee. He lost his seat in the 2011 Welsh Assembly election.

Post Assembly

Morgan currently sits on the Audit Risk and Assurance Committee for the Future Generations Commissioner for Wales.

References

External links
Biography at the National Assembly for Wales
Biography at Welsh Conservatives

Offices held

1974 births
Living people
Alumni of Cardiff University
Councillors in Cardiff
Politicians from Cardiff
Conservative Party members of the Senedd
Wales AMs 1999–2003
Wales AMs 2003–2007
Wales AMs 2007–2011
People educated at Bishop of Llandaff Church in Wales High School